Arram Beck is a small stream in the East Riding of Yorkshire, England, running through high embankments and flowing eastwards from the village of Arram to join the River Hull. Depths are variable due to the tidal nature of the Hull. It provides habitat for a variety of fish species (including perch, dace, roach) and chub have also been stocked here too.

History
Near to its junction with the River Hull, the Beck crosses over the Beverley and Barmston Drain, which runs to the west of, and parallel to, the Driffield Navigation and the river. It was authorised by the Beverley Barmston Drainage Act, which was passed by parliament in 1798. The tunnel carrying the drain under Arram Beck was one of eleven similar structures made necessary because the drain needed to cross existing waterways. The civil engineer for the project was William Chapman, who had submitted the original plans in 1796.

As part of the Environment Agency flood reduction works, Aike Beck was diverted into it in the 1990s.

Points of interest
Situated on the River Hull
Next place upstream = Leven Canal
Next place downstream = Beverley Beck

References

Bibliography

Rivers of the East Riding of Yorkshire